National Route 72 of the National Cycle Network, in Northern England is also called "Hadrian's Cycleway". It starts at Kendal and makes its way around the Cumbrian coast via Barrow-in-Furness and Whitehaven to Silloth, and then across the country through Carlisle via Newcastle upon Tyne to Tynemouth at the northern shore or to South Shields at the Tynes south shore, where the cycleway ends at Arbeia Roman Fort. Much of its route is very close to Hadrian's Wall.

Kendal to Barrow in Furness is mapped on the Walney To Wear map. Ravenglass to Tynemouth is open and mapped on the Hadrian's Cycleway map, though some sections between Ravenglass and Silloth are using interim routes.

External links

Hadrian's Cycleway at cycle-routes.org

Transport in Cumbria
National Cycle Routes